Thomas Pears Gordon Forman (b Repton 27 January 1885 - 22 November 1965) was Archdeacon of Lindisfarne  from 1944 until 1955.

Forman was educated at Shrewsbury and Pembroke College, Cambridge.  After a curacy at Kenilworth  he was an Assistant Master at his old school until wartime service as a Temporary Chaplain to the Forces. Following a further curacy in York he was Chaplain to the Duke of Portland until 1924.   After this he was Rector of Bothal  for twenty years  until his Archdeacon’s appointment.

References

1885 births
People from Repton
People educated at Shrewsbury School
Alumni of Pembroke College, Cambridge
Archdeacons of Lindisfarne
1965 deaths